Ariadne Díaz ((born Ariadne Rosales Diaz) was born on August 17, 1985, in Puerto Vallarta, Jalisco, Mexico) and is a Mexican actress and former model.

Biography
Díaz was born on August 17, 1986, in Puerto Vallarta. She is of Spanish and French descent. In 2006, she made her television debut on, RBD: La Familia in the episode El Que Quiera Azul Celeste...Que Se Acueste!. In 2007, she starred in the telenovela Muchachitas como tú, where she played Leticia Hernández. Ariadne was also cast in the dual co-protagonist/antagonist role of Florencia Echevarria de Belmonte in Al diablo con los guapos.

She also played the daughter of the villain "Barbara Greco" in Mañana Es Para Siempre. In 2010, Ariadne Díaz was given her first starring role portraying a chubby, charismatic girl Marianela Ruiz y de Teresa Pavon in Llena de Amor. In June 2012, she starred in Prince Royce's music video, Incondicional from his album Phase II.

In August 2013, she returned to Televisa where she was given her second starring role portraying Marcela Morales, in La Mujer Del Vendaval. In 2013, she played Pesados's love interest in their song's video "Cuando estas de buenas." In 2013, Ariadne returned to theatre playing Yolanda in the musical Perfume de Gardenia. In 2014 she played a special appearance as "Adriana Murillo de Gaxiola" mother of Esmeralda Pimentel in El Color de la Pasión. That same year Diaz played the protagonist in La Malquerida as the daughter of Victoria Ruffo's character, alongside Christian Meier and Mane de la Parra.

On November 9, 2016, Diaz was confirmed as the protagonist of Rosy Ocampo's telenovela La doble vida de Estela Carrillo, a series based on true events, in which she stars opposite David Zepeda.

Filmography

Film

Television roles

Awards and nominations

People en Español

Premios TVyNovelas

Premios Juventud

References

External links
 

1986 births
Living people
Mexican telenovela actresses
Mexican television actresses
Mexican stage actresses
Mexican female models
Actresses from Jalisco
21st-century Mexican actresses
People from Puerto Vallarta